Brodie Grundy (born 15 April 1994) is a professional Australian rules footballer playing for the Melbourne Football Club in the Australian Football League (AFL).

Early life and junior football
Grundy was born in Adelaide, South Australia and attended Cabra Dominican College, a private Catholic high school in the southern suburbs of the city, graduating in 2011. A former basketball player, Grundy switched to Australian rules football in 2010.
Brodie has a younger brother, Riley, who was drafted to Port Adelaide with pick 73 in the 2018 draft.

AFL career
Following a successful season playing as a ruckman with South Australian National Football League (SANFL) club Sturt's junior teams, Grundy was recruited by Collingwood with draft pick #18 in the 2012 AFL Draft.
 
Grundy was the Round 22 nomination for the 2013 AFL Rising Star award.

In March 2014, Grundy signed a three-year contract extension lasting until the end of the 2017 AFL season.

In 2018 he won the Herald Sun Player of the Year award with 27 votes, one clear of Melbourne ruck Max Gawn and Hawthorn midfielder Tom Mitchell. Grundy also won the Copeland medal for Collingwood's best and fairest in 2018, drawing with Steele Sidebottom.

After another All-Australian season in 2019, Grundy signed a seven-year, $1 million per-year deal with Collingwood. However, Grundy struggled to recapture his All-Australian form in subsequent years, with his salary criticised by some media figures. At the end of the 2022 AFL season, Collingwood traded Grundy to Melbourne for salary cap relief.

Playing style
Despite playing as ruckman, Grundy is able to follow up his ruckwork and win the ball himself and apply tackles. He has been labelled as a ‘fourth midfielder’ by his teammates. In the 2018 season, he averaged 20.2 disposals per match; 525 for the season (48th in the AFL), easily the highest amongst ruckmen.

Personal life
In December 2020, Grundy graduated from La Trobe University with a Bachelor of Health Sciences.

Statistics
Updated to the end of round 1, 2023.

|-
| 2013 ||  || 35
| 7 || 1 || 3 || 35 || 53 || 88 || 18 || 22 || 151 || 0.1 || 0.4 || 5.0 || 7.6 || 12.6 || 2.6 || 3.1 || 21.6 || 0
|- 
| 2014 ||  || 4
| 15 || 3 || 8 || 73 || 79 || 152 || 36 || 51 || 272 || 0.2 || 0.5 || 4.9 || 5.3 || 10.1 || 2.4 || 3.4 || 18.1 || 0
|-
| 2015 ||  || 4
| 19 || 8 || 3 || 156 || 137 || 293 || 66 || 85 || 462 || 0.4 || 0.2 || 8.2 || 7.2 || 15.4 || 3.5 || 4.5 || 24.3 || 0
|- 
| 2016 ||  || 4
| 21 || 11 || 8 || 190 || 197 || 387 || 81 || 92 || 548 || 0.5 || 0.4 || 9.0 || 9.4 || 18.4 || 3.9 || 4.4 || 26.1 || 7
|-
| 2017 ||  || 4
| 20 || 4 || 5 || 166 || 202 || 368 || 73 || 78 || 714 || 0.2 || 0.3 || 8.3 || 10.1 || 18.4 || 3.7 || 3.9 || 35.7 || 2
|- 
| 2018 ||  || 4
| 26 || 9 || 8 || 206 || 319 || 525 || 92 || 134 || 1038 || 0.4 || 0.3 || 7.9 || 12.3 || 20.2 || 3.5 || 5.2 || 39.9 || 17
|-
| 2019 ||  || 4
| 24 || 7 || 11 || 237 || 274 || 511 || 105 || 104 || style="background:#CAE1FF; width:1em" | 1022† || 0.3 || 0.5 || 9.9 || 11.4 || 21.3 || 4.4 || 4.3 || 42.6 || 23
|- 
| 2020 ||  || 4
| 19 || 3 || 3 || 105 || 168 || 273 || 57 || 68 || style="background:#CAE1FF; width:1em" | 593† || 0.2 || 0.2 || 5.5 || 8.8 || 14.4 || 3.0 || 3.6 ||31.3||6
|-
| 2021 ||  || 4
| 20 || 12 || 6 || 185 || 197 || 382 || 72 || 84 || 647 || 0.6 || 0.3 || 9.3 || 9.9 || 19.1 || 3.6 || 4.2 || style="background:#CAE1FF; width:1em" | 32.4† || 9
|-
| 2022 ||  || 4
| 6 || 2 || 0 || 53 || 48 || 101 || 15 || 23 || 182 || 0.3 || 0.0 || 8.8 || 8.0 || 16.8 || 2.5 || 3.8 || 30.3 || 1
|-
| 2023 ||  || 6
| 1 || 1 || 1 || 7 || 10 || 17 || 1 || 3 || 12 || 1.0 || 1.0 || 7.0 || 10.0 || 17.0 || 1.0 || 3.0 || 12.0 || 
|- class=sortbottom
! colspan=3 | Career
! 178 !! 61 !! 56 !! 1413 !! 1684 !! 3097 !! 616 !! 744 !! 5641 !! 0.3 !! 0.3 !! 7.9 !! 9.5 !! 17.4 !! 3.5 !! 4.2 !! 31.7 !! 65
|}

Notes

Honours and achievements
Individual
 Herald Sun Player of the Year: 2018
 2× Copeland Trophy: 2018, 2019
 2× All-Australian team: 2018, 2019
All Stars Representative Honours in Bushfire Relief Match: 2020
 AFL Rising Star nominee: 2013 (round 22)

References

External links

1994 births
Living people
Collingwood Football Club players
Sturt Football Club players
Australian rules footballers from South Australia
Copeland Trophy winners
All-Australians (AFL)